Chuanjiesaurus is a genus of sauropod dinosaurs from the middle Jurassic Period. They lived in what is now China. The type species, Chuanjiesaurus anaensis, was first described by Fang, Pang, Lü, Zhang, Pan, Wang, Li and Cheng in 2000. Fossils of the species were found in the village of Chuanjie, Lufeng County, Yunnan Province, (in Chuanjie Formation deposits) and are named after the location where the fossils were discovered. Holtz gave a length of 25 meters (82 ft).

References

Middle Jurassic dinosaurs of Asia
Sauropods
Fossil taxa described in 2000
Paleontology in Yunnan